NGC 5101 is a lenticular galaxy in the constellation Hydra. It is separated in the sky from the spiral galaxy NGC 5078 by about 0.5 degrees, and both are believed to be at the same distance from the Earth. This would mean they are approximately 800,000 light-years apart. Both galaxies are believed to be about the size of the Milky Way.

References

External links

Lenticular galaxies
Hydra (constellation)
5101
46661